Flippin is a surname. Notable people with the surname include:

 C. Myron Flippin, American conductor and cellist
 Chris Flippin (21st century), American guitarist
 Lucy Lee Flippin (born 1943), American actress
 Royce Flippin (born 1930s), American former college football player and athletics administrator